Îles Sous-le-Vent may refer to
 
 Leeward Islands, in the Caribbean
 Leeward Islands (Society Islands), in the southern Pacific Ocean